Charles Williams-Wynn may refer to:

Charles Williams-Wynn (1775–1850), British politician and Secretary at War of the early- to mid-19th century
Charles Williams-Wynn (1822–1896), Welsh Conservative politician, M.P. 1868–1880, son of the above

See also
Charles Wynn-Williams